Camptozygum aequale is a species of plant bug in the family Miridae. It is found in Europe and across the Palearctic (excluding China?) and North America. C. aequale is associated
with Pinus sylvestris.

References

Further reading

External links

 

Articles created by Qbugbot
Insects described in 1789
Mirini